Brachyptera is a genus of taeniopterygid stoneflies of mostly Western Palearctic distribution.

Species
These 30 species belong to the genus Brachyptera:

 Brachyptera algirica Aubert, 1956
 Brachyptera ankara Kazanci, 2000
 Brachyptera arcuata (Klapálek, 1902)
 Brachyptera auberti Consiglio, 1957
 Brachyptera beali (Navás, 1923)
 Brachyptera berkii Kazanci, 2001
 Brachyptera braueri Klapálek, 1900
 Brachyptera brevipennis Zhiltzova, 1964
 Brachyptera bulgarica Raušer, 1962
 Brachyptera calabrica Aubert, 1953
 Brachyptera demirsoyi Kazanci, 1983
 Brachyptera dinarica Aubert, 1964
 Brachyptera galeata Koponen, 1949
 Brachyptera graeca Berthélemy, 1971
 Brachyptera helenica Aubert, 1956
 Brachyptera kontschani Murányi, 2011
 Brachyptera macedonica Ikonomov, 1983
 Brachyptera monilicornis (Pictet, 1841)
 Brachyptera phthiotica Berthélemy, 1971
 Brachyptera putata (Newman, 1838)
 Brachyptera risi (Morton, 1896)
 Brachyptera seticornis (Klapálek, 1902)
 Brachyptera sislii Kazanci, 1983
 Brachyptera starmachi Sowa, 1966
 Brachyptera thracica Raušer, 1965
 Brachyptera transcaucasica Zhiltzova, 1956
 Brachyptera trifasciata (Pictet, 1832)
 Brachyptera tristis (Klapálek, 1901)
 Brachyptera vera Berthélemy & Gonzalez del Tanago, 1983
 Brachyptera zwicki Braasch & Joost, 1971

References

Taeniopterygidae